EMET or emet may refer to:

 Emet, a town in Turkey
 Emet (geographic region), a territorial division within the Kalenjin society of pre-colonial Kenya
 EMET Prize, an annual academic and cultural prize in Israel
 Endowment for Middle East Truth, a Washington, D.C., think tank focused on the Arab-Israeli conflict
 Enhanced Mitigation Experience Toolkit, a freeware security toolkit for Microsoft Windows